Oskar Benjamin Klein (15 September 1894 – 5 February 1977) was a Swedish theoretical physicist.

Biography

Klein was born in Danderyd outside Stockholm, son of the chief rabbi of Stockholm, Gottlieb Klein from Humenné in Kingdom of Hungary, now Slovakia and Antonie (Toni) Levy. He became a student of Svante Arrhenius at the Nobel Institute at a young age and was on the way to Jean-Baptiste Perrin in France when World War I broke out and he was drafted into the military.

From 1917, he worked a few years with Niels Bohr in the University of Copenhagen and received his doctoral degree at the University College of Stockholm (now Stockholm University) in 1921. In 1923, he received a professorship at University of Michigan in Ann Arbor and moved there with his recently wedded wife, Gerda Koch from Denmark. Klein returned to Copenhagen in 1925, spent some time with Paul Ehrenfest in Leiden, then became docent at Lund University in 1926 and in 1930 accepted the offer of the professorial chair in physics at the Stockholm University College, which had previously been held by Erik Ivar Fredholm until his death in 1927. Klein was awarded the Max Planck Medal in 1959. He retired as professor emeritus in 1962.

Klein is credited for inventing the idea, part of Kaluza–Klein theory, that extra dimensions may be physically real but curled up and very small, an idea essential to string theory.

In 1938, he proposed a boson-exchange model for charge-charging weak interactions (radioactive decay), a few years after a similar proposal by Hideki Yukawa.  His model was based on a local isotropic gauge symmetry and anticipated the later successful theory of Yang–Mills.

The Oskar Klein Memorial Lecture, held annually at the University of Stockholm, has been named after him. The Oskar Klein Centre for Cosmoparticle Physics in Stockholm, Sweden is also in his honor.

Oskar Klein is the grandfather of Helle Klein.

References

External links
 Oskar Klein; The Atomicity of Electricity as a Quantum Theory Law, Nature 1926, 118 (516) - doi = "10.1038/118516a0",
Oskar Klein; Quantentheorie und fünfdimensionale relativitätstheorie - Surveys in High Energy Physics, https://doi.org/10.1080/01422418608228771

1894 births
1977 deaths
Swedish physicists
Jewish physicists
Theoretical physicists
Stockholm University alumni
Members of the Royal Swedish Academy of Sciences
Swedish Jews
Hungarian Jews
Winners of the Max Planck Medal
University of Michigan faculty
Burials at Norra begravningsplatsen